Huawei Ascend Mate 2 4G is an Android smartphone manufactured by Huawei as part of the Huawei Mate series. A successor to the original Huawei Ascend Mate phablet unveiled in 2013, it has a revised design with a thinner build than its predecessor, adds support for LTE, and the ability to charge other USB devices with its own battery.

Unveiled at Consumer Electronics Show 2014, the device is expected to be released in China within the first quarter of 2014. Huawei also confirmed that with its support for LTE band 4, it plans to release the Ascend Mate 2 in the United States, naming AT&T as a possible partner.

Specifications

Hardware 
The Huawei Ascend Mate 2's unique selling point is its giant 4,050mAh battery, allowing it to charge other devices through its USB port. The Ascend Mate 2 features a remarkably big 6.1-inch 720p IPS LCD display, 1.6GHz quad-core Qualcomm Snapdragon 400 processor, and 2GB RAM. The device has a 13 MP rear-facing camera, and a 5 MP front-facing camera.

References 

Mate 2 4G
Android (operating system) devices
Mobile phones introduced in 2014
Discontinued smartphones
Phablets